Oeming is a German-language surname and may refer to:

 Al Oeming (1925–2014), Canadian wildlife conservationist, zoologist, professional wrestler and wrestling promoter
 Michael Avon Oeming (fl. 1998–present), American comic book creator, both as an artist and writer

German-language surnames